Alard may refer to:

 Alard (surname)
 Alard, son of Duke Aymon in the Matter of France
 Alard, Iran, a village in Tehran Province
 Alard, East Azerbaijan, a village in Iran
 Alard Stradivarius (disambiguation), two violins
 Alard–Baron Knoop Stradivarius, 1715
 Artot–Alard Stradivarius, 1728

See also
Allard (disambiguation)